This list of historic places in Dunedin covers all historical areas, places and buildings on the New Zealand Heritage List / Rārangi Kōrero that fall entirely or in part within Dunedin City. It also covers places of local importance or historical notability.

Māori settled in Otago relatively soon after reaching New Zealand, and the Dunedin area was a major whaling centre and site of early European colonisation. The building boom from the gold rush of the 1860s, coupled with the relative stagnation of the region's population in the 20th century, has led to the preservation of many old structures and sites. Dunedin City is 255 km² in area, covering Otago Harbour, the Taieri Plains and the tussock-covered mountains near Middlemarch. Some of the historical sites listed here are therefore rural in nature.

Exceptional historical places are included in the national register (administered by Heritage New Zealand) in five groups: historic places (Category 1 and 2), historic areas,  (practical sites),  (spiritual sites) and  areas.  there are 827 listings in Otago, of which 207 are Category 1 historic places. This list covers all historical areas, places and buildings on the New Zealand Heritage List that fall entirely or in part within Dunedin City. It also covers places of local importance or historical notability.

The Dunedin City Council also maintains a Heritage Register of buildings included in the national register and those which add to the character of the city. The additions to the national register are based on an assessment of the significance of values which are outlined in the Significance Assessment Guidelines (2019).

Areas of exceptional cultural and historical importance

Historic places and buildings

Heritage New Zealand Register, Category I

Heritage New Zealand Register, Category II

Other notable places of historical significance

See also
List of historic hotels in Otago
History of the Dunedin urban area
History of the Otago Region
List of historic places in Christchurch
List of historic places in Palmerston North

References

Bibliography
Croot, Charles (1999). Dunedin churches past and present. Dunedin: Otago Settlers Association.

External links
https://builtindunedin.com/about/ Historic buildings in Dunedin (blog)
http://dunedintimetravel.blogspot.com/ Historic and recent photos of Dunedin buildings

 
Dunedin
History of Dunedin